Lorna Dunkley (born 23 February 1972 in Cirencester) is an English newsreader, television presenter and journalist. Until July 2016, she was a news anchor for Sky News, Sky's 24-hour television news network and hosted the weekend afternoon slot at 2-5pm. She joined the Australian Broadcasting Corporation, and regularly presents the news on ABC News. She lives in Australia.

Early years
Dunkley was born in Cirencester, Gloucestershire, and when she was six months old her family moved to Cornwall where she grew up.

Education
Dunkley undertook part-time school work with both BBC Radio Cornwall and Pirate FM 102. She graduated in Communication Studies from the University of Glamorgan (now the University of South Wales) and completed a post-graduate course in Broadcast Journalism at University College Falmouth.

Life and career
Dunkley undertook researcher work with ITV Westcountry in Plymouth. She then became a reporter, covering stories including the Devon road protests and the environmentalist Swampy’s eight-day-long underground protest. She then fronted Westcountry Live from 2000.

After going freelance, Dunkley joined Sky News in 2002, and after a period as a reporter presented Sky News Sunrise, Live at Five, Sky News Today and Sky News at Ten, mostly at weekends. She moved from Sky News Sunrise to the weekend presenting line-up, joining Steve Dixon, Mark Longhurst and Chris Roberts. Dunkley left Sky News in July 2016, after a round of job cuts.

In August 2018, Lorna joined the Australian Broadcasting Corporation, and regularly presents the news on ABC News in Australia.

Recognition
Dunkley was named the BT Young Journalist of the Year in 1996, and attended a Buckingham Palace reception as a Young Achiever in Business in 1998.

Personal life
Dunkley has two sisters. She and her husband Brad lived in west London with their two sons James and Ollie before moving to Australia.

References

1972 births
Living people
English television presenters
English journalists
English reporters and correspondents
Sky News newsreaders and journalists
People from Bodmin
Alumni of the University of Glamorgan
Alumni of Falmouth University